Qaleh-ye Hoseyn Ali (also Romanized as 'Qal‘eh-ye Ḩoseyn ‘Alī; also known as Qal‘eh Ḩasan ‘Alī, Qal‘eh-i-Hasan ‘Ali, and Qal‘eh-ye Ḩasan ‘Alī) is a village in Hoseynabad-e Goruh Rural District, Rayen District, Kerman County, Kerman Province, Iran. At the 2006 census, its population was 16, in 4 families.

References 

Populated places in Kerman County